Polycystin refers to one of the following proteins:

 Polycystin-1 (PKD1)
 Polycystin-2 (PKD2)

See also
 Polycystine